"The Treasure of Abbot Thomas" is a ghost story by British writer M. R. James. It was published in his book Ghost Stories of an Antiquary (1904).

Plot summary
The tale tells the story of the Rev. Justin Somerton, a scholar of medieval history, who tells a rector the frightening tale of how, while searching an abbey library, he found clues leading him to the hidden treasure of a disgraced abbot.

Adaptations
In 1974, the story was adapted as part of the BBC's A Ghost Story for Christmas strand by John Bowen as The Treasure of Abbot Thomas. It was first broadcast on 23 December 1974 at 11.35. The adaptation stars Michael Bryant as Somerton, and it was directed by Lawrence Gordon Clark.

In creating his adaptation, Bowen changed a number of elements of M. R. James's story, such as including another character – Peter, Lord Dattering (Paul Lavers) – as Somerton's protégé, with whom he shares his investigation. The story is not told in flashback, and also includes a scene in which Somerton exposes two fraudulent mediums, which acts as a demonstration of Somerton's rational approach to the supernatural.

A parody, written by Stephen Sheridan and named The Teeth of Abbot Thomas, was made for radio broadcast.

References

External links

 

1904 short stories
Ghosts in written fiction
Short stories by M. R. James
Short stories adapted into films
Horror short stories